West Creek is an unincorporated community and hamlet located within Eagleswood Township in Ocean County, New Jersey, United States.

History
The settlement is named after the stream that runs through it, Westecunk Creek. The name of the creek is derived from the Lenape word "westeconk," meaning "place of fat meat".

Education
Present day schools are Eagleswood Elementary School and Pinelands Regional School District.

Location
The area is served as United States Postal Service ZIP code 08092. As of the 2000 United States Census, the population for ZIP Code Tabulation Area 08092 was 3,003. The village is served by a general aviation airport, Eagles Nest Airport.

More history
Captain Hazelton Seaman built and designed the first sneakbox, the "Devil's Coffin," in 1836, in West Creek, New Jersey.

References

External links
Census 2000 Fact Sheet for ZIP Code Tabulation Area 08092 from the United States Census Bureau

Eagleswood Township, New Jersey
Populated places in the Pine Barrens (New Jersey)
Unincorporated communities in Ocean County, New Jersey
Unincorporated communities in New Jersey